is a song by Japanese rock band Asian Kung-Fu Generation. It was released as the first single of their third studio album, Fanclub, on November 30, 2005. The song entered the top five on the Oricon charts and sold well over 100,000 copies by 2006, becoming the 94th single of the year.

Music video
The music video for "Blue Train" was directed by Kazuyoshi Oku. The PV premiered on air on Gogoichi -Space Shower Chart Show- on November 13, 2005. It displays the band waiting at a metro station for a train. In 2006, the video earned AKG their third consecutive win at the SPACE SHOWER Music Video Awards when it won Best Group Video.

Track listing

Personnel
Masafumi Gotō – lead vocals, rhythm guitar
Kensuke Kita – lead guitar, background vocals
Takahiro Yamada – bass, background vocals
Kiyoshi Ijichi – drums
Asian Kung-Fu Generation – producer
Yusuke Nakamura – single cover art

Charts

External links

References

Asian Kung-Fu Generation songs
2005 singles
Songs written by Masafumi Gotoh
2005 songs
Ki/oon Music singles